Ken Shuttleworth may refer to:

Ken Shuttleworth (architect) (born 1952), English architect
Ken Shuttleworth (cricketer) (born 1944), English Test cricketer